Lecourt is a French surname. Notable people with the surname include:

 Dominique Lecourt (1944–2022), French philosopher
 Robert Lecourt (1908–2004), French lawyer, politician and judge, President of the European Court of Justice 1967–76

French-language surnames